Khanbika Khanum  (b. 1856, Shusha, Russian Empire - d. Aghdam, Azerbaijan SSR, 1921) as an Azerbaijani poetess.

Life 
She was born in 1856 in the city of Shusha. Researcher Beylar Mammadov claims that her real name was Fatmabika. In 1872, she married Colonel Amanulla Khan, a descendant of Nakhchivan Khans. Akbar Nakhchivanski, her son from this marriage, donated to the museum the figures, the ivory chessman that Alexandre Dumas gave to Khurshidbanu Natavan. After the death of Colonel Amanulla Khan (1845-1891), she married the merchant Jabbar Alasgarov.

Family 
He belonged to the Karabakh khans on his mother's side, and the Qumuq khans on his father's side. Her father was a Kumyk major-general, Khasay Khan Utsmiyev (1808–1866). Her grandfather Mehdigulu Khan was the last khan of Karabakh. Her mother was an Azerbaijani poet and philanthropist. His brother Mehdigulu Khan Vafa was a lieutenant colonel in the Imperial Russian Army and authored poetry under pseudonym Vafa (Persian: وفا, lit. 'Loyal').

She died in 1921 and was buried in the Imarat cemetery, which is the cemetery of the family of Karabakh khans.

Poetry 
She started writing poems from childhood under the influence of Mirza Sadiq Sadiq and Mirza Rahim Fena. He mainly wrote ghazals and rubai. Khanbika Beyim wrote poems in Azerbaijani Turkish and Persian languages. One of the people who influenced her the most in her poetry is her mother Khurshidbanu Natavan. Few of her works have been published in the press of that time. The main part of her works was discovered from the archives and published in modern times. Several of her ghazals were published in Vasif Guliyev's book "The Path to Yesterday". This book shows that Khanbika was one of the participants of "Majlisi-uns".

See also 
 Gamar Sheyda

References

Works cited
 

1856 births
1921 deaths
Azerbaijani women poets
19th-century Azerbaijani poets
20th-century Azerbaijani poets
Writers from Shusha
People from the Russian Empire
Azerbaijani people of Kumyk descent